Isoorientin (or homoorientin) is a flavone, a chemical flavonoid-like compound. It is the luteolin-6-C-glucoside. Bioassay-directed fractionation techniques led to isolation of isoorientin as the main hypoglycaemic component in Gentiana olivieri. Studies also showed that isoorientin is a potential neuroprotective compound against Alzheimer's disease.

Natural occurrences 
Isoorientin can be isolated from the passion flower, Vitex negundo, Terminalia myriocarpa, the Açaí palm and Swertia japonica.

Metabolism 
 Isoorientin 3'-O-methyltransferase

See also
 Orientin, the 8-C glucoside of luteolin.

References 

Flavone glucosides
C-glycoside natural phenols